A satellite state or dependent state is a country that is formally independent in the world but under heavy political, economic, and military influence or control from another country. The term was coined by analogy to planetary objects orbiting a larger object, such as smaller moons revolving around larger planets, and is used mainly to refer to Central and Eastern European countries of the Warsaw Pact during the Cold War or to Mongolia or Tannu Tuva between 1924 and 1990, for example. As used for Central and Eastern European countries, it implies that the countries in question were "satellites" under the hegemony of the Soviet Union. In some contexts, it also refers to other countries in the Soviet sphere of influence during the Cold War, such as North Korea (especially in the years surrounding the Korean War of 1950–1953), Cuba (particularly after it joined the Comecon in 1972), North Vietnam during Vietnam War, and to some countries in the American sphere of influence, such as South Vietnam (particularly during the Vietnam War). In Western usage, the term has seldom been applied to states other than those in the Soviet orbit. In Soviet usage, the term applied to the states in the orbit of Nazi Germany, Fascist Italy, and Imperial Japan.

The Oxford English Dictionary traces the phrase satellite state in English back as late as 1916.

In times of war or political tension, satellite states sometimes serve as buffers between an enemy country and the nation exerting control over the satellites.

Interwar period 
When the Mongolian Revolution of 1921 broke out, Mongolian revolutionaries expelled Russian White Guards (during the Russian Civil War of 1917–1923 following the communist October Revolution of 1917) from Mongolia, with the assistance of the Soviet Red Army. The revolution also officially ended Manchurian sovereignty over Mongolia, which had existed since 1691. Although the theocratic Bogd Khanate of Mongolia still nominally continued, with successive series of violent struggles, Soviet influence got ever stronger. After the death of the Bogd Khaan ("Great Khan", or "Emperor"), the Mongolian People's Republic was proclaimed on November 26, 1924. A nominally independent and sovereign country, it has been described as being a satellite state of the Soviet Union in the years from 1924 until 1990.

During the Russian Civil War, the Soviet Red Army troops took Tuva in January 1920, which had also been part of the Qing Empire of China and a protectorate of Imperial Russia. The Tuvan People's Republic, was proclaimed independent in 1921 and was a satellite state of the Soviet Union until its annexation in 1944 by the Soviet Union.

Another early Soviet satellite state in Asia was the short-lived Far East Republic in Siberia.

Post-World War II 
At the end of World War II, most eastern and central European countries were occupied by the Soviet Union, and along with the Soviet Union made up what is sometimes called the Soviet Empire. The Soviets remained in these countries after the war's end. Through a series of coalition governments including communist parties, and then a forced liquidation of coalition members disliked by the Soviets, Stalinist systems were established in each country. Stalinists gained control of existing governments, police, press and radio outlets in these countries. Soviet satellite states included:
  People's Republic of Albania (1946–1961)
  Polish People's Republic (1947–1989)
  People's Republic of Bulgaria (1946–1990)
  Romanian People's Republic (1947–1965)
  Czechoslovak Socialist Republic (1948–1989)
  German Democratic Republic (1949–1990)
  Hungarian People's Republic (1949–1989)
  Federal People's Republic of Yugoslavia (1945–1948)
  Mongolian People's Republic (1925–1990)
The three Communist countries of Eastern Europe which managed to shake off Soviet control were Albania, Romania and Yugoslavia. The Federal People's Republic of Yugoslavia is sometimes referred to as a Soviet satellite, though it broke from Soviet orbit in the 1948 Tito–Stalin split, with the Cominform offices being moved from Belgrade to Bucharest, and Yugoslavia subsequently formed the Non-Aligned Movement. The People's Socialist Republic of Albania, under the leadership of Stalinist Enver Hoxha, broke ties with the Soviet Union in the 1960 Soviet–Albanian split following the Soviet de-Stalinization process. In 1961, with Chinese support, Albania managed to wrestle itself from Soviet influence. The last country was Romania, with the de-satellization of Romania starting in 1956 and ending by 1965. Romania was fully aligned with the Soviet Union until the early 1960s, throughout its first 15 years as a Communist state. However, serious economic disagreements with Moscow resulted in a 1964 formal rejection of all Soviet designs and interference in the affairs of other Communist states.

The Democratic Republic of Afghanistan can also be considered a Soviet satellite; from 1978 until 1991, the central government in Kabul was aligned with the Eastern Bloc and was directly supported by the Soviet military between 1979 and 1989. The short-lived East Turkestan Republic (1944–1949) was a Soviet satellite until it was absorbed into the People's Republic of China along with the rest of Xinjiang.

The Mongolian People's Republic was a Soviet satellite from 1924 to 1991. The Soviet Union so tightly controlled it that it ceased to exist in February 1992, less than two months after the dissolution of the Soviet Union.

Democratic Republic of Vietnam; (later the Socialist Republic of Vietnam) was also a satellite state of the Soviet Union. The Soviet Union supplied North Vietnam with a large number of weapons, and food,... as well as sent experts to consult during the Vietnam War. After the Vietnam War, the Soviet Union maintained billions of dollars in economic aid to Vietnam, which lasted until the dissolution of the Soviet Union...

Post-Cold War use of the term 
Some commentators have expressed concern that United States military and diplomatic interventions in the Balkans and in the Middle East and elsewhere might lead, or perhaps have already led, to the existence of American satellite states. William Pfaff has warned that a permanent American presence in Iraq would "turn Iraq into an American satellite state".  The term has also been used in the past to describe the relationship between Lebanon and Syria, as Syria has been accused of intervening in Lebanese political affairs. In addition, Eswatini and Lesotho have both been described as satellite states of South Africa. In Europe, Belarus has also been described as a satellite state of the Russian Federation.

See also 
 Buffer state
 Client state
 Vassal state
 Puppet state
 Neo-colony
 Protectorate
 Banana republic
 Sister republic

Notes

References 
 
 
 
 
 
 
 

1910s neologisms
Client state
Post-Soviet states